Jan Izydor Sztaudynger (Kraków, 28 April 1904 – 12 September 1970, Kraków) was a Polish poet and satirist who enjoyed enormous popularity after World War II.

Life
Jan Sztaudynger studied Polish and German philology at Kraków's Jagiellonian University.

He is known for his epigrams, which in Poland are called fraszki (singular: fraszka). Sztaudynger called some of his epigrams piórka (singular: piórko).

In 1964 Sztaudynger published a poetry collection, Tranzytem przez Łódź (Transit through Łódź), in which he expressed nostalgia for that city's Fraszka cafe.

See also
 Stanisław Jerzy Lec — contemporary writer of aphorisms

References
 Poet's Corner (1998): Jan Sztaudynger
 The City of Lodz Office: Jan Izydor Sztaudynger

External links
 Fraszki collection
 Photographs of Jan Sztaudynger

1904 births
1970 deaths
Jagiellonian University alumni
Aphorists
Writers from Kraków
20th-century Polish poets
20th-century Polish male writers
Burials at Salwator Cemetery
Polish people of German descent
Polish people of French descent
Academic staff of Adam Mickiewicz University in Poznań
Polish satirists